Cannabis in Andorra is illegal.

The trafficking of cannabis can be punished by up to two years in prison and fines totally double the value of the drug. Individual use of cannabis or similar in a public space may be punished by arrest, or by fines up to 600 Euros.

References

Andorra
Politics of Andorra
Andorra